Herman Marie Ghislaine d'Oultromont (2 April 1882 in Brussels – 17 February 1943 in Woluwe-Saint-Lambert) was a Belgian equestrian who took part in the 1920 Olympic Games in Antwerp.

Oultromont won an Olympic silver medal at the 1920 Summer Olympics in Antwerp. He was part of the Belgian team who came in second place in the team competition in show jumping. The Belgian team consisted of André Coumans on the horse "Lisette", Henri Laame on "Biscuit", Herman de Gaiffier d'Hestroy on "Miss" and d'Oultromont on the horse "Lord Kitchener".

Olympic medals
1920  Antwerp -  Silver in equestrian, show jumping, team (Belgium)

References

1882 births
1943 deaths
Belgian male equestrians
Olympic equestrians of Belgium
Equestrians at the 1920 Summer Olympics
Olympic silver medalists for Belgium
Olympic medalists in equestrian
Medalists at the 1920 Summer Olympics
Belgian military personnel killed in World War II